Levon Ichkhanian (born May 16, 1964) is an Armenian-Lebanese guitarist.

Career
The son of Armenian jazz pianist Edouard Ichkhanian, he was born on May 16, 1964, and moved with his family from Lebanon to Toronto, Ontario, when he was 12. In his teens he switched from classical guitar to electric guitar. At 13 he performed professionally with Armenian pop singer Adiss Harmandian. Four years later a scholarship from the Ontario Arts Council helped him study jazz at the University of Toronto. In the 1990s he took lessons from jazz guitarists Jim Hall, Steve Khan, and Pat Martino. In addition to guitar he plays mandolin, bouzouki, and oud.

Discography
 After Hours
 Travels 
 Kick-n' Jazz

References

External links
 Official site

1964 births
Canadian jazz composers
Canadian jazz guitarists
Canadian male guitarists
Canadian people of Armenian descent
Lebanese people of Armenian descent
Lebanese emigrants to Canada
Living people
Male jazz composers
Musicians from Beirut